Raorchestes travancoricus, variously known as the Travancore bushfrog, Travancore bubble-nest frog, or Travancore tree frog, is a species of frog in the family Rhacophoridae. The species is endemic to the southern Western Ghats, India. Its specific name, travancoricus, as well as its three common names, refer to its type locality, Bodinayakkanur in the former Travancore state (now in Tamil Nadu).

Rediscovery
For some time, R. travancoricus was feared to be extinct. In early 2009, University of Delhi researchers announced that the species had been rediscovered in the Western Ghats. The rediscovery was a result of intense surveying in the Western Ghats. Before the discovery of a single male from Vandiperiyar in 2004, the species had not been recorded after its description in 1891 by George Albert Boulenger. More recently, two males have been found from Vagamon. The species remains very rare, and the known populations, both in Kerala, occur in disturbed habitat (tea plantations) outside protected areas.

Description
Its back is light-greyish red to brown with prominent brown broad lines alternating with thin faint lines. It has a yellowish brown iris. R. travancoricus is a close relative of R. luteolus with which it could be confused.

References

Further reading
Boulenger GA. 1891. On new or little-known Indian and Malayan Reptiles and Batrachians. Ann. Mag. Nat. Hist., Sixth Series 8: 288-292. (Ixalus travancoricus, new species, p. 291).

External links

travancoricus
Frogs of India
Endemic fauna of the Western Ghats
Taxonomy articles created by Polbot
Amphibians described in 1891